Rod Laver and Fred Stolle were the defending champions but only Laver competed that year with Jeff Borowiak.

Borowiak and Laver won in the final 6–3, 6–2 against Georges Goven and François Jauffret.

Seeds
Champion seeds are indicated in bold text while text in italics indicates the round in which those seeds were eliminated.

  Patricio Cornejo /  Jaime Fillol (semifinals)
  Anand Amritraj /  Vijay Amritraj (quarterfinals)
  Jeff Borowiak /  Rod Laver (champions)
  Ismail El Shafei /  Paul Gerken (first round)

Draw

External links
 1974 Volvo International Doubles draw

Doubles